The 2019 season was Loughborough Lightning's fourth and final season, in which they competed in the final edition of the Women's Cricket Super League, a Twenty20 competition. The side finished second in the group stage, winning seven of their ten matches, therefore progressing to the semi-final. However, they lost to Southern Vipers in the semi-final by 5 wickets.

The side was captained by Georgia Elwiss and coached by Rob Taylor. They played four of their home matches at the Haslegrave Ground and one at Trent Bridge. Following the season, women's domestic cricket in England was reformed, with the creation of new "regional hubs", with Loughborough Lightning replaced by Lightning, which retained some elements of the original team but represent a larger area.

Squad
Loughborough Lightning's 15-player squad is listed below. Age given is at the start of Loughborough Lightning's first match of the season (6 August 2019).

Women's Cricket Super League

Season standings

 Advanced to the Final.
 Advanced to the Semi-final.

League stage

Semi-final

Statistics

Batting

Bowling

Fielding

Wicket-keeping

References

Loughborough Lightning (women's cricket) seasons
2019 in English women's cricket